Markfield Road Pumping Station, now known as Markfield Beam Engine and Museum or sometimes just as Markfield Beam Engine is a Grade II listed building containing a  beam engine, originally built in 1886 to pump sewage from Tottenham towards the Beckton Works. The grounds of the building now form a public park known as Markfield Park. The River Moselle joins the River Lea at this location.



Markfield Beam Engine

Markfield Beam Engine is a free-standing steam engine  with a  flywheel that moves a  beam. The beam drives two single-acting plunger pumps. Each pump is 26 inches in diameter and has a 51-inch stroke. When the machine was operational it had a working speed of 16 rpm and each pump could move  a day.

The engine is finely decorated, with doric style columns and acanthus leaves.

History

The sewage works opened in 1864, The scheme was led by the Tottenham and Wood Green Drainage Board, and was connected to the London County Council drainage system and the Northern Outfall Sewer. The current beam engine was built by Wood Brothers of Sowerby Bridge, Yorkshire, in 1886 and commissioned in 1888, replacing an earlier 45 horsepower beam engine. It is the only surviving Wood Brothers eight column engine in situ. It was used continuously from its installation until 1905, when it was relegated to occasional duty for stormwater pumping. The works were finally closed for operation in February 1964, having been replaced by Deephams Sewage Treatment Works in Edmonton.

In 1970, the River Lee Regional Park Authority took a lease on the engine house, and a group of volunteers took on the task of restoring the engine, coming together as the River Lee Industrial Archaeology Society. The engine house and engine were Grade II listed in 1974. Markhouse Beam Engine and Museum was formed in 1984.

Over £3 million has been spent on restoring the engine, building and surrounding grounds, a full restoration of the park was completed by April 2010, and the park, museum, and beam engine re-opened for public access. The funding was secured through various sources including the Heritage Lottery Fund, Football Foundation, DCLG and Big Lottery Fund.  The museum is open on Sundays and Bank Holidays, and the engine is now occasionally run for public display.

See also 

 Walthamstow Pumphouse Museum
 Crossness Pumping Station

References 

Grade II listed buildings in the London Borough of Haringey
Grade II listed industrial buildings
London water infrastructure
History of the London Borough of Haringey
Preserved beam engines
Engine houses
Museums in the London Borough of Haringey
Parks and open spaces in the London Borough of Haringey
Steam museums in London
Buildings and structures in Tottenham